Ella Juulia Junnila (born 6 December 1998) is a Finnish high jumper, who represents Tampereen Pyrintö. She has previously represented Janakkalan Jana and Vammalan seudun Voima. She represented Finland in 2018 European Athletics Championships in high jump and finished 17th with a result of 186 cm. She won a bronze medal at the 2019 European Athletics U23 Championships with a result of 192 cm.

Junnila set a new Finnish record, 194 cm, on 11 June 2019 in Turku at the Paavo Nurmi Games. This earned her a place in the 2019 World Championships in Athletics for high jump. She improved the record by jumping 195 cm on 3 July 2019 in Tampere.

She has qualified to represent Finland at the 2020 Summer Olympics.

Competition record

Personal life
Her mother, retired long jumper Ringa Ropo-Junnila, represented Finland at the 1992 Summer Olympics in addition to winning eight national championships and holding the current national record.

References

External links
 

Finnish female high jumpers
Living people
1998 births
Finnish Athletics Championships winners
World Athletics Championships athletes for Finland
Athletes (track and field) at the 2020 Summer Olympics
Olympic athletes of Finland
Sportspeople from Espoo
20th-century Finnish women
21st-century Finnish women